Bad Reputation is the twelfth studio album by American singer, rapper, and musician Kid Rock. It was released digitally on March 21, 2022, and on physical CD on April 6, 2022, by Top Dog Records. The album spawned five singles: "Don't Tell Me How to Live" which features Monster Truck, "Ala-Fuckin-Bama", "We the People", "The Last Dance" and "Rockin'", and only 3 music videos were released. This was the first album since 1996's Early Mornin' Stoned Pimp to be released by Top Dog Records independently.

Background 
The album was at first announced in late 2019 and was originally scheduled for release in 2021. On January 17, 2021, he held a birthday live stream event and originally announced the name of his album to be Kid Motherfuckin' Rock and announced a total of 50 songs including 10 hip hop songs, 10 rock songs, 10 country songs and 20 previously unreleased songs. The album name was announced in January 2022 during a birthday bash concert at Billy Bob's in Fort Worth, Texas.

Music and lyrics
Bad Reputation is a Southern rock and country album. Some of the lyrics reflect Kid Rock's support of former President Donald Trump and criticism of President Joe Biden. "Don't Tell Me How To Live" is a rap rock cover of a song by Monster Truck, who are featured on the recording. The song's sound was compared to that of the album Devil Without a Cause. The song "We the People" attacks the media, Dr. Anthony Fauci, masks, COVID-19 restrictions, and Big Tech, and features the chant "Let's go Brandon" in the chorus.

Reception

Upon its initial release, Bad Reputation failed to chart on the Billboard 200 chart in its first week of eligibility, breaking a streak of top 10 debuts on the chart dating back to Cocky in 2001. The album debuted on Billboards Independent Albums chart at number 31, the Top Rock Albums chart at number 39, the Top Current Album Sales chart at number 9 and the Top Album Sales chart at number 15. Two weeks after its release, the album had sold 25,000 copies.

It debuted at number 124 on the Billboard 200 chart on April 23, 2022, a month after its release.

The album was universally panned by critics. Stephen Thomas Erlewine called it "a record that confirms [Kid Rock's] diminished status by catering exclusively to the only audience he has left: aging hard rockers who also are stuck in the past."

Touring 
On April 6, 2022, Kid Rock embarked on his Bad Reputation Tour. Ritchie had announced he would specifically not tour locations with coronavirus mask and vaccine mandates.

Track listing

Personnel
Kid Rock
 Robert James Ritchie Sr. - drum programming, drums, acoustic guitar, keyboards, percussion, background vocals, B3 Organ, turntables

Additional personnel

Backing vocalists
 Herschel Boone – background vocals
 Shannon Curfman – background vocals
 Gretchen Wilson – background vocals
 Robert James – background vocals
 Perry Coleman – background vocals
 Kate Falcon – background vocals
 Victoria Camp – background vocals
 Amanda Gene Rowland – background vocals
 Stacy Michelle – background vocals
 Mason Douglas – background vocals (uncredited)
 Jason Wyatt – background vocals (uncredited)
Drummers
 Jerry Roe
 Greg Morrow
 Evan Hutchings
 Miles McPherson
 John "Rook" Cappelletty
 Richard Millsap
Others
 Mark Douthit – saxophone
 Russ Phal – pedal steel guitar
 Max Abrams – saxophone
 Marlon Young – bass guitar, acoustic guitar, electric guitar
 David Roe Rorick – bass, drums
 Peter G Abbott – engineer
 Jimmie "Bones" Trombly – keyboards, piano, B3 Organ, harmonica
 Tim Watson – fiddle
 T.J. Watson – acoustic guitar, vocals
Guitarists
 Gordy Quist – electric guitar
 Adam Shoenfeld – electric guitar
 Ed Jurdi – acoustic guitar
 Nathan Young – electric guitar
 Rob McNelley – electric guitar
 Vinnie Dombroski – electric guitar
 Nick Bockrath – electric guitar
 Tom Bukovac – electric guitar
 Gordy Quist – acoustic guitar
 Dean James – electric and acoustic guitar
 Gannin Arnold – electric guitar
Pianists
Peter Keys – keyboards
 Jim Jonsin – keyboards
 Gordon Mote – piano (credited as "Gordan Mote")
 Jim "Moose" Brown – piano, B3 Organ
 Dave Cohen – piano, B3 Organ, keyboards, synths
Bassists
 Jimmie Lee Sloas – bass guitar
 Alison Prestwood – bass guitar
 Scott Davis – bass guitar
 Mark Hill – bass guitar
 Tony Lucido – bass guitar

Charts

References

2022 albums
Southern rock albums
Country albums by American artists
Kid Rock albums
Albums impacted by the COVID-19 pandemic